Shad Thames is a historic riverside street next to Tower Bridge in Bermondsey, London, England, and is also an informal name for the surrounding area. In the 19th century, the area included the largest warehouse complex in London.

Location
The street Shad Thames has Tower Bridge at its west end, and runs along the south side of the River Thames, set back behind a row of converted warehouses; it then takes a 90-degree turn south along St Saviour's Dock. The street is partly cobbled. The nearest stations are Tower Hill, Tower Gateway (both requiring a river crossing to access), Bermondsey and London Bridge.

Name

The street Shad Thames is named as such in John Rocque's 1747 map of London. The name may be a corruption of 'St John-at-Thames', a reference to the St John's Church which once stood south-west of the street, where the present-day London City Mission is located Alternatively it may be from shad fish, which could be found in the Thames.

The surrounding area is also today called Shad Thames, or Butler's Wharf (after the largest of the riverside warehouses). Both names refer to a  rectangle of streets, converted warehouses and newer buildings, bounded by the Thames, Tower Bridge Road, Tooley Street and St Saviour's Dock (or arguably Mill Street); it forms the most north-easterly corner of the SE1 postcode district.

The "Woodcut" map of London of c.1561 calls the general area "Horssey Down". The 1872 Ordnance Survey 1:2500 map calls it "St John Horselydown", meaning the parish of St John's Church in Horselydown, though this area extended somewhat further south and west than the modern-day Shad Thames. As it was originally a large field for grazing horses and cattle, it may be a corruption of 'Horse Down'.

Industrial history
In Victorian times, Shad Thames included the largest warehouse complex in London. Completed in 1873, the warehouses housed huge quantities of tea, coffee, spices and other commodities, which were unloaded and loaded onto river boats. For this reason, the area became known as the 'larder of London'. An 1878 book says:

Shad Thames, and, indeed, the whole river-side, contain extensive granaries and storehouses for the supply of the metropolis. Indeed, from Morgan's Lane—a turning about the middle of Tooley Street, on the north side, to St. Saviour's (once called Savory) Dock, the whole line of street—called in one part Pickle Herring Street, and in another Shad Thames—exhibits an uninterrupted series of wharves, warehouses, mills, and factories, on both sides of the narrow and crowded roadway.

During the 20th century the area went into decline as congestion and containerization forced shipping to unload goods further east, and the last warehouses closed in 1972.

Many artists lived in the area in the 1970s (presumably owing to the low cost of living there); these reportedly included David Hockney and Derek Jarman.

Shad Thames was regenerated in the 1980s and 1990s, when the disused but picturesque warehouses throughout the area were converted into expensive flats, many with restaurants, bars, shops, etc. on the ground floor.

Places of interest
As part of the regeneration of the area, designer and restaurateur Terence Conran opened a number of now well-known riverside restaurants including Le Pont de la Tour, the Blueprint Cafe and the Butler's Wharf Chop House. The area also includes numerous cafes, bars, shops and estate agents.

Public access to the riverside was obtained by local community activists including Maggie Blake, after whom an alley leading from Shad Thames to the riverfront, Maggie Blake's Cause, is named.

Terence Conran was also involved in founding the Design Museum near the east end of Shad Thames, which housed exhibitions of graphic and product design; however, the museum relocated to Kensington in 2016, to a larger building formerly occupied by the Commonwealth Institute. The former Design Museum was largely empty as of April 2017, and was expected to be converted into luxury apartments.

The presence nearby of Tower Bridge, the Tower of London, Potters Fields Park, More London (where various cultural events take place) and The Shard mean that this once-overlooked area is now frequented by tourists.

Residents and properties

Shad Thames has many residents, particularly living in converted warehouses, and development of new flats continues. They are represented by the Shad Thames Residents’ Association.
The converted warehouses retain their original characteristic features of brickwork, winches, large sign-writing and so on, and most are named after the commodities which were originally stored in them – Vanilla & Sesame Court, Cayenne Court, Wheat Wharf, Tea Trade Wharf, with further buildings named after cinnamon, cardamom, fennel, caraway, ginger, cumin, tamarind, clove, anise and coriander. It is said that a century of spices had infused into the brickwork, so after they were converted into flats the first residents of each building could still detect the scent after which it was named. Various new buildings have been constructed, with similarly evocative names, such as Spice Quay Heights and China Wharf.

Shad Thames's proximity to the City of London, which is about a mile north-west on the other side of the river, means that many residents are wealthy City workers, and the restaurants are frequented by City folk at lunchtime. Consequently, local property prices are very high. Properties with river views are particularly expensive, having balconies, and dramatic views of the Thames, Wapping (across the river), Tower Bridge, the "Gherkin", and even the distant Canary Wharf; though flats nearer the bridge also command a view of the grey concrete Guoman Hotel (formerly known as the Tower Hotel) on the north side of the river, considered by many to be an eyesore. Most of the warehouses retain the original relatively small windows, which limit their views; some of the newer buildings have better views—for example, flats on the east end of Spice Quay Heights have wide floor-to-ceiling windows on two sides. One of the student residences of the London School of Economics is located on Gainsford Street in the centre of the area.

Among the most striking features of Shad Thames are the walkways which criss-cross the street high overhead. Most of them now connect the Butlers Wharf building and the Cardamom Building, and were originally used as bridges to roll barrels and the like between warehouses. They are now used as balconies by the adjoining flats. Photographs from the early 20th century show that at the peak of warehouse usage there were many more of these bridges than survive today.

The river

There is a wide variety of river-going traffic next to Shad Thames. It is part of the particularly deep section of river called the Pool of London, which even ships can navigate. Hence, from time to time even full-size cruise ships or naval vessels will stop next to Shad Thames, usually for a day or so, often then proceeding through Tower Bridge (though they can go no further than the next crossing, London Bridge). Police boats and speedboats pass by frequently, as do passenger boats (such as the Damien Hirst-decorated 'Tate to Tate' boat), and yachts from St Katharine Docks on the north side of the river opposite Shad Thames.

Cultural references

Film and television
Owing to its buildings, cobbled streets, riverside views and proximity to landmarks such as Tower Bridge, Shad Thames has been used as a location for many films and TV programmes, including:
The Long Memory (1952) in which Mr Berry's office is located in Shad Thames
Alfie (1966) filmed at Butler's Wharf in Shad Thames 
Oliver! (1968), partly shot in the area, including the warehouse New Concordia Wharf. Charles Dickens' novel on which it is based was partly set just east of Shad Thames, in the slum area Jacob's Island where Bill Sikes lived
Diamonds on Wheels (1974) filmed at street level and inside pre-conversion warehouses
Jubilee (1978)
The Elephant Man (1980)
The French Lieutenant's Woman (1981)
The Doctor Who serial Resurrection of the Daleks (1984) (specifically scenes involving the destination of the Daleks' time corridor)
Make Peace Not War  
Dempsey and Make peace (1985) The climax of the story was filmed in and around the warehouses, in the dockside area. Leading to a race against time and a shootout on Tower Bridge. Dempsey rescued Makepeace from two armed thugs and disabled a Daimler.
A Fish Called Wanda (1988), in which John Cleese's character dangles from an upper storey of Reed's Wharf
Bernard and the Genie (1991)
The World Is Not Enough (1999), in whose opening scenes James Bond's speed boat passes New Concordia Wharf and traverses the length of St Saviour's Dock
Bridget Jones's Diary (2001)
The Bollywood movie Viruddh (2005), specifically shots inside and in front of Spice Quay Heights
The Bollywood movie Jhoom Barabar Jhoom (2007), the dance scenes of which were filmed next to the Java Wharf buildings
The Bollywood movie Goal (2007)
Harry Potter and the Order of the Phoenix (2007) filmed at Butler's Wharf in Shad Thames
Run Fat Boy Run (2007) 
Spooks (2010)
Set the Thames on Fire (2015) was partly shot in the area, taking much of the film's architectural inspiration from its cobbled streets and riverside location
In the TV series Penny Dreadful, Dr. Victor Frankenstein lives at 17 Shad Thames.
Death in Paradise (2017)
Come Away (2020) in which Shad Thames is used for scenes shot in a Victorian era market
Cruella (2021)

Music
An instrumental track called "Shad Thames" appears on the 1997 Saint Etienne album Continental and 2001 compilation Smash the System.

References

Streets in the London Borough of Southwark
Districts of London on the River Thames
Port of London
Bermondsey